Tenthredininae are a subfamily of sawflies within the family Tenthredinidae, the largest sawfly family. It consists of about 50 genera, including the type genus Tenthredo. It also includes most of the larger and more colourful members of the family. Some authorities divide these into tribes. Distribution is Northern Hemisphere and holarctic.

Taxonomy 
Tribes
 Perineurini
 Sciapterygini
 Tenthredopsini
 Tenthredinini
 Macrophyini

References

Bibliography 

 
 
 
 , in

External links 
 BugGuide: Subfamily Tenthredininae

Tenthredinidae